Ronald Amstutz (born 1952) is the former state representative for the 1st District of the Ohio House of Representatives, serving from both 1983 to 2000, and again from 2009 to 2016. He also served as state senator for the 22nd District of the Ohio Senate and as mayor of Orrville, Ohio.  In the House, he was the chairman of the House Finance & Appropriations Committee.  He is a Republican.

Life and career
A lifelong resident of Wayne County, Representative Amstutz was raised on a dairy farm between Dalton and Kidron. In 1971, he moved to Orrville and has lived in Wooster since 1981. He served on the Orrville City Charter Commission in 1974 and 1975. His political career began in 1976 when he was elected Mayor of the City of Orville. He held the position through 1980, when he ran successfully for the Ohio House of Representatives. Prior to his career in public service, Representative Amstutz worked for five years in the Orrville office of The Daily Record. Amstutz is a graduate of Central Christian High School and holds his bachelor's degree in government communications from Capital University.

Amstutz won his first term in the Ohio House of Representatives in 1980, replacing five term representative John Johnson. The original district was composed of all of Wayne County, and portions of Stark County and Holmes County.  Term limits went into effect in Ohio in 1992, allowing legislators from that point on to only serve eight consecutive years in one chamber.  With the completion of his tenth term in 2000, Amstutz was ineligible to run again in the House. However, Senator Grace L. Drake of the 22nd District of the Ohio Senate was also facing term limits. Amstutz ran for her seat, and won.  He was sworn in as a state senator on January 8, 2001.  In the Ohio Senate, Amstutz served as chairman of Senate Ways and Means from 2003 to 2008. In 2004, Amstutz successfully ran for reelection.

Ohio House of Representatives
Amstutz initially discussed running for Congress, in the 16th Congressional District, which incumbent of 18 terms, Ralph Regula, was planning to vacate. However, he soon after decided he would return to the Ohio House of Representatives. He faced primary opposition from Charlie Hardmen, but won the election with 64% of the vote. He went on to win the general election handily. Amstutz was chosen to be Ranking Member of the House Finance and Financial Institutions Committee for the 128th General Assembly.

When Republicans regained control of the House for the 129th General Assembly, Amstutz serves as Chairman of the Finance and Appropriations Committee. He again served as Chairman in the 130th General Assembly.

Committee assignments
Finance & Appropriations—Chair
State Controlling Board

Wayne County Commissioner
Amstutz currently serves as a Wayne County Commissioner since departing the Ohio House of Representatives. He was first elected in 2016.

Electoral history

Personal life
Representative Amstutz and his wife have two grown children and live in Wooster, Ohio.

References

External links
Ron Amstutz for State House campaign site
Project Vote Smart- Ron Amstutz 

Living people
Capital University alumni
Republican Party members of the Ohio House of Representatives
Republican Party Ohio state senators
1952 births
21st-century American politicians
People from Wayne County, Ohio
People from Orrville, Ohio
Mayors of places in Ohio
People from Wooster, Ohio